Julio César Furch (born 29 July 1989) is an Argentine professional footballer who plays as a forward for Liga MX club Atlas.

Honours

Olimpo
Primera B Nacional: 2009–10

Arsenal de Sarandi
Copa Argentina: 2012–13

Veracruz
Copa MX: Clausura 2016

Santos Laguna
Liga MX: Clausura 2018

Atlas
Liga MX: Apertura 2021, Clausura 2022
Campeón de Campeones: 2022

Individual
Liga MX Best XI: Clausura 2015, Clausura 2018, Apertura 2018, Apertura 2021
CONCACAF Champions League Team of the Tournament: 2019
Liga MX All-Star: 2022

References

External links 
 

Julio Furch at ESPN Deportes

1989 births
Living people
Argentine people of Volga German descent
Association football forwards
Argentine footballers
Argentine expatriate footballers
Argentine Primera División players
Primera Nacional players
Liga MX players
Olimpo footballers
San Lorenzo de Almagro footballers
Arsenal de Sarandí footballers
Club Atlético Belgrano footballers
Santos Laguna footballers
C.D. Veracruz footballers
Atlas F.C. footballers
Expatriate footballers in Mexico
People from La Pampa Province